Red Tavern (Italian: Taverna rossa) is a 1940 Italian "white-telephones" comedy film directed by Max Neufeld and starring Alida Valli, André Mattoni, and Lauro Gazzolo. It was made at Cinecittà in Rome. A young woman eventually marries a count after a series of misunderstandings.

Cast
 Alida Valli as Susanna Sormani  
 André Mattoni as Il conte Carlo Torresi  
 Lauro Gazzolo as Il marchese Domenico Torresi, suo zio  
 Oreste Bilancia as Il signor Sormanni  
 Lilia Dale as Ninon  
 Umberto Sacripante as Il ladruncolo  
 Aristide Garbini as Cesarone, il maggiordomo  
 Luigi Erminio D'Olivo as Il tenore Farelli  
 Anna Doré as Floriana  
 Livia Minelli as La commesa del negozio di dischi 
 Alfredo Martinelli as Un cliente del negozio di dischi 
 Rita Durnova as Lisetta 
 Paola Doria as Francesca  
 Ernesto Torrini as Il cameriere del locale 
 Armida Bonocore as Maria

References

Bibliography 
 Gundle, Stephen. Mussolini's Dream Factory: Film Stardom in Fascist Italy. Berghahn Books, 2013.

External links 
 

1940 films
Italian comedy films
Italian black-and-white films
1940 comedy films
1940s Italian-language films
Films directed by Max Neufeld
Films shot at Cinecittà Studios
1940s Italian films